Watson Log Cabin in Tahoe City, California, was built in 1908 by Robert Montgomery Watson.  It was listed on the National Register of Historic Places in 1979.

It is the only historic log cabin in the Tahoe City area.

The cabin is now owned by the North Lake Tahoe Historical Society and is open to the public seasonally.

Watson Creek and Watson Lake, just north of Lake Tahoe, are also named for R. M. Watson.

References

External links

North Lake Tahoe Historical Society

Historic house museums in California
Museums in Placer County, California
Lake Tahoe
History of Placer County, California
Houses on the National Register of Historic Places in California
Houses completed in 1908
Log cabins in the United States
Houses in Placer County, California
National Register of Historic Places in Placer County, California
Log buildings and structures on the National Register of Historic Places in California
1908 establishments in California